Mövenpick Hotel Colombo is a five-star luxury hotel in Colombo, Sri Lanka. The hotel is part of the hotel chain brand Mövenpick Hotels & Resorts and is owned by the Sri Lankan conglomerate, Softlogic Holdings. It is the first hotel to be launched in Colombo in 25 years. The hotel is 24-storey high and includes 219 rooms.

History

The hotel was declared open on 9 January 2017 by President Maithripala Sirisena. It is the first five-star hotel in Colombo in 25 years. The hotel has won the "Sri Lanka's Leading Hotel" award and the "Sri Lanka's Leading Hotel Suite" award at the World Travel Awards in 2017, 2018 and 2019. Roshan Perera, the new general manager, was appointed to the hotel in December 2020.

COVID-19 pandemic
A member of the staff of the hotel tested positive for COVID-19 on 26 December 2020 during a routine check. Mövenpick Hotel Colombo received the "Safe and Secure Level 1 Hotel" certification in March 2021. The hotel was audited by KPMG as part of the certification. After the temporary closure due to the COVID-19 pandemic, the hotel reopened in October 2021.

Amenities
The hotel has three restaurants, AYU, an International cuisine buffet restaurant; Robata Grill, an Asian cuisine restaurant; Vistas Bar, the rooftop bar on the 24th floor. Ayu restaurant is located on the fourth floor and has a walk-in wine and cheese cellar. The hotel's other amenities include an infinity pool, a whirlpool tub with the cityview, a branch of Spa Ceylon and a gym on the 23rd floor. The Mansion is the members-only executive lounge in the lobby of the hotel. Whiskey and Cigar Lounge is another members-only lounge in the hotel.

See also
 List of hotels in Sri Lanka

References

External links
 

2017 establishments in Sri Lanka
Hospitality companies of Sri Lanka
Hotels established in 2017
Hotels in Colombo